Mammoth Pool Dam is a hydroelectric dam located on the San Joaquin River in the southern Sierra Nevada mountain range of California, about  northeast of Fresno. It forms Mammoth Pool Reservoir and lies within the Sierra National Forest. The dam and reservoir were named after a large natural pool in the river that was once located above the present dam site.

History
In 1900, engineer John S. Eastwood and several wealthy investors founded the Mammoth Power Company with the goal of harnessing hydroelectric power from the upper San Joaquin River. The Mammoth Pool site, where the San Joaquin River canyon chokes down to a narrow gap between massive walls of solid granite, was immediately seen as an attractive dam site. However, the investors involved with Mammoth eventually lost interest due to the enormous scope of the project. By 1901, the Mammoth Pool proposal was shelved.

During the mid-1950s, development of hydroelectric facilities in the upper San Joaquin basin began to pick up again and plans were finalized for the construction of Mammoth Pool and its associated power station. Construction of the main dam embankment started in October 1958 after the San Joaquin River was diverted through a -long tunnel to bypass the dam site. Work progressed fairly quickly, although the builders ran into problems with exfoliation of granite sheets, probably caused by drilling and explosive charges along the steep walls of the gorge. The dam was topped out almost exactly one year later in late 1959.

Purpose
The dam serves mainly for the generation of hydroelectric power. It is an important component of Southern California Edison's Big Creek Hydroelectric Project, which comprises a system of 25 dams, nine power plants and supporting tunnels and diversion channels in the upper basin of the San Joaquin River. Water from the reservoir is diverted into a -long reinforced concrete penstock into Mammoth Pool Powerhouse, which has two 100,000 hp turbines totaling a nominal generating capacity of 190 megawatts (MW). Due to friction decreasing flow rate in the power tunnel, the actual output during maximum generation is only about 187 MW. The  hydraulic head afforded to the power plant is almost three times greater than the dam's structural height.

Dimensions

Any higher water will flow over an uncontrolled ogee crest spillway cut into the rock of the San Joaquin Canyon about a quarter of a mile to the west of the main dam.

Environmental impacts
Mammoth Pool Dam has caused the submersion of a migratory route commonly used by mule deer in the Sierra, forcing them to swim across the reservoir during their spring and autumn migrations. The reservoir is closed to all public use between May 15 to June 15 to prevent disturbance of the deer population.

This has resulted in severe declines in fish populations in the stretch between Mammoth Pool and Dam No. 6, where the outflow from the Mammoth Pool powerhouse is located.

See also

Big Creek (San Joaquin River)
List of power stations in California
List of reservoirs and dams in California
List of the tallest dams in the United States

References

Buildings and structures in Fresno County, California
Buildings and structures in Madera County, California
Dams completed in 1959
Dams in California
Hydroelectric power plants in California
Rock-filled dams
Southern California Edison dams
Dams on the San Joaquin River